Eucithara isseli is a small sea snail, a marine gastropod mollusk in the family Mangeliidae.

Distribution
This marine species is found in the Red Sea and the Persian Gulf; off Sri Lanka; the Philippines and the Loyalty Islands.

Description
The length of the shell varies between 8 mm and 12 mm.

The color of the shell is white, with two narrow, interrupted orange bands, one of which reappears on the spire.

References

 Nevill, G. & Nevill, H. 1875. Descriptions of nine marine Mollusca from the Indian Ocean. 1. Asiatic Soc. Bengal [n.s.] 44(2): 8~104, pis 7,8.
 Bouge, L.J. & Dautzenberg, P.L. 1914. Les Pleurotomides de la Nouvelle-Caledonie et de ses dependances. Journal de Conchyliologie 61: 123-214

External links
  Tucker, J.K. 2004 Catalog of recent and fossil turrids (Mollusca: Gastropoda). Zootaxa 682:1-1295
 

isseli
Gastropods described in 1875